Pierson John Shirley Dixon (29 December 1928 – 24 March 2017), known as Piers Dixon, was a British Conservative Party politician who represented Truro between 1970 and 1974.

Early life
The son of diplomat and writer, Sir Pierson Dixon, he was educated at Eton College; Magdalene College, Cambridge; and Harvard Business School. He worked as a stockbroker.

Career
Dixon contested Brixton at the 1966 general election and was elected Member of Parliament (MP) for Truro in 1970. He was re-elected in February 1974, but lost the seat to the Liberal David Penhaligon in the October 1974 general election, by 464 votes (0.8%).

No Conservative MP represented Truro after Dixon's defeat until Sarah Newton regained the seat from the Liberal Democrats in 2010. Alan Clark noted Dixon in his 1983–92 diaries, writing "when (the Liberals) get stuck in, really stuck in, they are devilish hard to dislodge".

Interests 
Dixon was a member of the Monday Club and the Bow Group.

Personal life 
Dixon married four times. His first wife was the sculptor Edwina Sandys, a daughter of Duncan Sandys and Diana Churchill. They had two sons, Mark and Hugo. The second was Janet, Countess of Cowley. In 1984, Dixon married Anne Cronin, daughter of John Desmond Cronin, former Labour MP; they had one son, Alexander. In 1994, he married Ann Mavroleon, daughter of John Davenport.

Death 
He died in March 2017 at the age of 88.

References

External links 
 

1928 births
2017 deaths
Conservative Party (UK) MPs for English constituencies
Harvard Business School alumni
Members of the Parliament of the United Kingdom for Truro
People educated at Eton College
UK MPs 1970–1974
UK MPs 1974